The 1986–87 BYU Cougars men's basketball team represented Brigham Young University as a member of the Western Athletic Conference during the 1986–87 basketball season. Led by head coach LaDell Andersen, the Cougars compiled a record of 21–11 (12–4 WAC) to finish second in the WAC regular season standings. The team played their home games at the Marriott Center in Provo, Utah. The Cougars received an at-large bid to the NCAA tournament. In the opening round, BYU was defeated by New Orleans, 83–79.

Roster

Schedule and results

|-
!colspan=9 style=| Regular Season

|-
!colspan=9 style=| WAC Tournament

|-
!colspan=9 style=| NCAA Tournament

Rankings

References

BYU Cougars men's basketball seasons
Byu
Byu